West Virginia Route 103 is an east-west state highway located in McDowell County, West Virginia. The eastern terminus of the route is at West Virginia Route 161 southwest of Pageton. The western terminus is at U.S. Route 52 and West Virginia Route 16 in southern Welch.

WV 103 was formerly part of West Virginia Route 102, which previously reentered West Virginia from Tazewell County, Virginia.  WV 102 ran along the route of County Route 84, WV 161, and WV 103 into Welch.  Sometime between 1976 and 1980, the western section of WV 102 was eliminated and WV 103 gained its current number.

Major intersections

References

103
Transportation in McDowell County, West Virginia